Godfrey Kateregga (5 May 1960 – 13 March 1999) was a football striker who played for Uganda national football team.

Career
Born in Mulago (a suburb of Kampala), Kateregga played club football for Tobacco FC, Kampala City Council FC, SC Villa and Express FC. He won four Ugandan Premier League titles (two each with KCC and Villa) and won the Ugandan Cup five times (four with KCC and one with Villa).

Kateregga made several appearances for the Uganda senior national team.

References

External links

1960 births
1999 deaths
Ugandan footballers
Uganda international footballers
Kampala Capital City Authority FC players
SC Villa players
Express FC players
Association football forwards
Sportspeople from Kampala